The following lists events that happened during 1846 in New Zealand.

Population
The estimated population of New Zealand at the end of 1846 is 71,050 Māori and 13,274 non-Māori.

Incumbents

Regal and viceregal
Head of State – Queen Victoria
Governor – Sir George Grey

Government and law
Chief Justice – William Martin

Events 
 5 January:  The Māori language magazine, Te Karere o Nui Tireni publishes its last issue. It started in 1842. It is revived as The Maori Messenger and Te Manuhiri Tuarangi between 1849 and 1863.
 11 January: British forces occupy Ruapekapeka pa.
 17 January: The Auckland Times ceases publication. The newspaper was first published in 1842.
 11 March: The brig H.M.S. Osprey (Captain Patten) is driven ashore and wrecked at Herekino Harbour, having mistaken it for the entrance to the Hokianga Harbour, but no lives are lost.
 7 May: Little Waihi landslide kills around 60 Maori, including Mananui Te Heuheu Tukino II.
 16 May: Māori led by Te Mamaku attack the fortified outpost at Boulcott's farm near the modern-day Belmont in the Hutt Valley. Six troopers and an unknown number of Māori are killed as the attack is repulsed.
 23 July: Te Rauparaha is captured by government forces at Porirua.
 28 August: The New Zealand Constitution Act 1846 is passed by the Parliament of the United Kingdom with the intention of granting self-government to the colony. Governor George Grey suspends implementation of the majority of the Act, with the exception of the creation of New Ulster and New Munster Provinces, and it is superseded by the New Zealand Constitution Act 1852.
 December: Thomas Brunner sets out on a journey of exploration south of Nelson which will eventually take 18 months to complete.

Births

 1 May (in England): Edward Robert Tregear, surveyor, civil servant, linguist
 7 April: Edwin Mitchelson, politician

Deaths

 7 May: Mananui Te Heuheu Tukino II, tribal leader

Unknown date
Te Whatanui, tribal leader

See also
List of years in New Zealand
Timeline of New Zealand history
History of New Zealand
Military history of New Zealand
Timeline of the New Zealand environment
Timeline of New Zealand's links with Antarctica

References

External links